The pale brown long-nosed bat (Lichonycteris degener) is a species of leaf-nosed bat in the family Phyllostomidae. It is found across South America. It is apparently gregarious and lives in social groups.

Taxonomy 
The species was formerly thought to be in dark long-tongued bat (L. obscura), but is now recognized as a separate species.

Distribution and habitat 
The species is found in the Andes from Colombia, Venezuela, Guyana, Suriname, French Guiana, Ecuador, Peru, Bolivia, and Brazil. It lives at an elevation of 50-900 m. Most specimens are observed in dense forests. However, it is rare locally, though that may be because of a lack of knowledge on its ecological requirements.

Biology

Diet 
The bat mostly eats nectar and insects.

Conservation 
The species has been rated as Least Concern on the latest IUCN Red List assessment for it in July 2016. However, the threats to the species are not well known due to lack of knowledge about its ecology. It may occur in some protected areas throughout its Amazon range.

References 

Taxa named by Gerrit Smith Miller Jr.
Mammals described in 1931
Bats of South America
Phyllostomidae
Bats of Brazil
Mammals of Colombia
Mammals of Venezuela
Mammals of Guyana
Mammals of Suriname
Mammals of French Guiana
Mammals of Ecuador
Mammals of Peru
Mammals of Bolivia